Gaylord Theodor "Tarzan" Woltzen (June 29, 1905 – July 21, 1995) was an American professional basketball player. He played college basketball for Bradley University in the mid-1920s before playing in the National Basketball League. In the NBL, Woltzen played for the Kankakee Gallagher Trojans during the 1937–38 season but did not score a single point in eight career games.

References 

1905 births
1995 deaths
American men's basketball players
Basketball players from Illinois
Bradley Braves men's basketball players
Forwards (basketball)
Guards (basketball)
Kankakee Gallagher Trojans players
People from Woodford County, Illinois